Paul László or Paul Laszlo (6 February 1900 – 27 March 1993) was a Hungarian-born architect and interior designer whose work spanned eight decades and many countries. László built his reputation while designing interiors for houses, but in the 1960s, largely shifted his focus to the design of retail and commercial interiors.

Biography
He was born (as Lamberger Pal) in Debrecen, Hungary, to Jewish parents Lamberger Ignác and László Regina (née Schwarcz). His family later moved to Szombathely, Hungary. Sources citing his birthplace as Budapest are incorrect. He had three sisters and two brothers; two of his sisters and both of his parents were murdered in the Holocaust along with seven other relatives not in his immediate family.

László completed his education in Vienna, Austria before moving to Stuttgart, Germany, where he rapidly established himself as a prominent designer, winning the admiration of, among others, Salvador Dalí. However, the rising tide of anti-semitism and Nazism made László's position precarious in Europe due to his Jewish ancestry. He applied for and accepted a professorship teaching architecture at the Universidad Tecnica Federico Santa Maria in Chile. However, never intending to go to South America, László was hidden by friends of his until 1936, when he was able to get passage on an oceanliner, which was not headed to South America, but rather New York City. Ironically, and without László's knowledge, some of his work appeared in Adolf Hitler's Eagle's Nest (the Kehlsteinhaus) near Berchtesgaden which infuriated Albert Speer, chief architect of Nazi Germany and close advisor to Hitler.

Arriving in New York City, he bought an automobile, drove to Southern California, and established an office in affluent Beverly Hills, California. László's reputation preceded him. He was popular with the wealthy political and acting elite.

László was notoriously intransigent in his design projects but with his own unique style. He personally preferred generously dimensioned furniture, but, for one client who was sensitive about his small stature, László designed all of the furnishings in slightly smaller-than-standard scale.

In 1948, László joined with George Nelson, Charles Eames and Isamu Noguchi to design for the Herman Miller company. The furniture lines presented by Herman Miller from 1948 have been called the most influential groups of furniture ever manufactured. Nevertheless, László was not pleased with the arrangement and the relationship ended in 1952. Starting in 1941 and continuing for over 25 years, László maintained his design studio at 362 North Rodeo Drive in Beverly Hills. László rented the entire building from the owner when it was still incomplete and he immediately took on the task of designing the interiors, the exterior details and all of the furniture complete with fabrics. The studio also had a small area showcasing his work and helped him achieve even greater prominence. He designed department stores for Bullock's Wilshire, Goldwaters, Robinson's, Saks Fifth Avenue, Halls (Crown Center, Kansas City), Hudson's Bay and Ohrbach's. Also, he designed many of the casinos and showrooms in the Howard Hughes-owned hotels in Las Vegas. László achieved further fame with his elegant bomb shelter designed for John D. Hertz. He also conceived "Atomville," a futuristic underground city, of which a later version was proposed in a letter to the U.S. Air Force.

As evidence of László's long and highly regarded career, photographs, renderings and descriptions of his work appear in books and periodicals from every decade starting in the 1920s and are still being published in the 21st century. Time magazine (August 18, 1952)  described him as "the Millionaire's Architect" in an article about László. He had an ability to combine colors which might seem irreconcilable, yet when seen as a whole, were warm and beautiful. It was this use of color along with the large scale and flowing lines to his designs and the integration of an entire project which distinguished his work.

László served in both World Wars. He fought with the Hungarian artillery on the Italian front in World War I, and he enlisted in the United States Army and served domestically during World War II.

Autobiographical information is available on László's life in the publication "Designing With Spirit," an oral history conducted by the University of California, Los Angeles. László donated much of his original materials to the Architecture and Design Collection at the University of California, Santa Barbara. His work is occasionally displayed at the Museum of Modern Art in New York City and is frequently seen in national and international retrospectives on 20th-century design.

Personal life
Paul László was married twice and had one son (Peter Paul) with his second wife, the actress Maxine Fife. László had two brothers; Stephen and Elemér.  László's remains are at the Westwood Village Memorial Park & Mortuary, Los Angeles, California.

Notes

External links
Time magazine: "Rich Man's Architect", August 18, 1952
Art & Antiques
Paul Laszlo's obituary
Southern California Architectural History blog

Hungarian furniture designers
American furniture designers
Architects from California
Hungarian architects
American people of Hungarian-Jewish descent
Hungarian emigrants to the United States
Jewish architects
Hungarian Jews
Austro-Hungarian Jews
Jewish emigrants from Nazi Germany to the United States
1900 births
1993 deaths
Burials at Westwood Village Memorial Park Cemetery
People from Debrecen
20th-century American architects